Nat Levison was a British actor. He worked for the BBC in London then moved to Australia where he worked on stage, radio, television and film.

Select Credits
Pardon Miss Westcott (1959)
The Slaughter of St Teresa's Day (1960)
Inn of the Damned (1975)

References

External links
Nat Levison at IMDb
Nat Levison at Ausstage

Australian male actors